Syncordulia gracilis, the yellow presba, is a species of dragonfly in the family Corduliidae.

Distribution and status
Endemic species to the south western Western Cape Province, South Africa , with one historic 1948 record from, KwaZulu-Natal Province Drakensberg area, and one record 2000 from Prentjiesberg in Eastern Cape Province. It is rare throughout its range. It is no longer seen at many sites where it once was present, hence its vulnerable Red List status.

Habitat
Its natural habitats are montane streams and rivers flowing over flat rocks, with fynbos or grassy banks localities.

Identification
This species is about 43–48 mm long, with a wingspan 60–70 mm. Sexes much alike but ♀ has an amber wash on forewing and hindwing. The thorax has two yellow stripes on each side, and the abdomen is yellow and black.

References 

Odonata of Africa
Insects of South Africa
Corduliidae